Trickfinger is the first studio album by Trickfinger, the alias of American musician John Frusciante. The album was released on April 7, 2015, on the AcidTest label. This was Frusciante's second release under the Trickfinger alias. His first was the 2012 two track Sect In Sgt EP.

On January 28, 2015, Frusciante released the song "After Below" as a preview to the album.

Background
Frusciante said of the album, "I started being serious about following my dream to make electronic music, and to be my own engineer, five years ago. For the 10 years prior to that, I had been playing guitar along with a wide range of different types of programmed synthesizer and sample-based music, emulating what I heard as best as I could. I found that the languages machines forced programmers to think in had caused them to discover a new musical vocabulary...

In 2007, I started to learn how to program all the instruments we associate with acid house music and some other hardware. For about seven months I didn’t record anything. Then I started recording, playing 10 or so synced machines through a small mixer into a CD burner. This was all experimental acid house, my skills at making rock music playing no part in it whatsoever. I had lost interest in traditional songwriting and I was excited about finding new methods for creating music. I’d surround myself with machines, program one and then another and enjoy what was a fascinating process from beginning to end…"

Critical reception

Writing for Exclaim!, Chad Barnes called the record "a fun, engaging album with complex, weaving, synth-based hooks that are often played in a similar style to Frusciante's guitar playing".

Track listing

References

2015 albums
John Frusciante albums